Ron Lynch is an American stand-up comedian, actor, and writer.  He has appeared in a number of movies and television shows, including Corporate, Corpse Tub, Another Period, Dope State, Comedy Bang! Bang!, and Portlandia.  He has worked as a voice actor for several animated shows, including Home Movies, Bob's Burgers,  and Tom Goes to the Mayor, and has made guest appearances on Dr. Katz, Professional Therapist, The Sarah Silverman Program, Andy Richter Controls the Universe, Adventure Time, and Star vs the Forces of Evil.

Lynch hosted a weekly musical and comedic variety show called Tomorrow! comedy show, every Saturday night at midnight at The Steve Allen Theater in Hollywood, California.  That venue was sold in 2017 and condominiums are planned at the site.
The final Tomorrow! Show at The Steve Allen Theater took place on September 30, 2017. The Tomorrow! Show returned at the new venue of Dynasty Typewriter at the Hayworth Theatre on February 3, 2018, and has since moved to the Lyric Hyperion Theatre. 
Other live shows he has performed in include a show called The Idiots, performed with co-writer and co-actor Craig Anton and a rotating cast of characters.

Partial filmography
Science Court (1997)
Dr. Katz, Professional Therapist (1997)
Raising Dad (2001–2002)
Andy Richter Controls the Universe (2003)
Home Movies (1999–2004)
Lovespring International (2006)
Tom Goes to the Mayor (2004–2006)
The Sarah Silverman Program (2007)
Tim and Eric Awesome Show, Great Job (2007–2008)
WordGirl (2007–2015)
Bob's Burgers (2011–present)
Adventure Time (2011–2018)

References

External links

 

American male film actors
American stand-up comedians
American male television actors
American male voice actors
Living people
1953 births
People from Bethpage, New York